Martiniquais may refer to:
Something of, from, or related to Martinique, an island in the Caribbean Sea
A person from Martinique, or of Martiniquais descent; see Demographics of Martinique and Culture of Martinique

See also

Language and nationality disambiguation pages